UFC Fight Night: Gaethje vs. Vick (also known as UFC Fight Night 135) was a mixed martial arts event produced by the Ultimate Fighting Championship that was held on August 25, 2018 at Pinnacle Bank Arena in Lincoln, Nebraska, United States.

Background 
The show was the UFC’s third visit to Nebraska, with the previous two events contested in Omaha.

A lightweight bout between former WSOF Lightweight Champion Justin Gaethje and Al Iaquinta was expected to serve as the event headliner. However on June 28, it was announced that Iaquinta withdrew from the bout and was replaced by James Vick.

Bryan Barberena was expected to face Jake Ellenberger at UFC Fight Night: Rivera vs. Moraes. However, Barberena pulled out of the fight citing a leg injury and the bout was scrapped. The pairing was rescheduled for this event.

Alexa Grasso was expected to face former Invicta FC Strawweight Champion Angela Hill at the event, but pulled out on July 19 due to a knee injury. She was replaced by Cortney Casey.

Antônio Braga Neto was expected to face The Ultimate Fighter: Team Joanna vs. Team Cláudia light heavyweight winner Andrew Sanchez at the event. However, Neto was removed from the bout on August 2 due to undisclosed personal issues and replaced by Markus Perez.

Results

Bonus awards
The following fighters received $50,000 bonuses:
Fight of the Night: Cory Sandhagen vs. Iuri Alcântara
Performance of the Night: Justin Gaethje and Eryk Anders

See also
List of UFC events
2018 in UFC
List of current UFC fighters

References

UFC Fight Night
2018 in mixed martial arts
Mixed martial arts in Nebraska
Sports in Lincoln, Nebraska
2018 in sports in Nebraska
August 2018 sports events in the United States